Sosefo Ma'ake (born 15 September 1991, Tonga) is a rugby union footballer. He  plays internationally for Tonga and competed at the 2015 Pacific Nations Cup. He plays as a Halfback. Ma'ake was named in Tonga's 2015 Rugby World Cup.

References

External links

Living people
People from Tongatapu
Tonga international rugby union players
Tongan rugby union players
Tongan expatriate rugby union players
1991 births